Manuel Alberto Cobo Almagro (born 21 June 1984) is a Spanish ex-footballer who played for Real Jaén as a winger in third division.

Club career
Born in Jaén, Andalusia, Cobo was an unsuccessful youth graduate at Real Madrid, and played amateur football until the age of 27. In July 2011 he signed with Real Jaén in Segunda División B, after having represented the club's reserves seven years before.

Cobo achieved promotion to Segunda División at the end of the 2012–13 season, but played sparingly due to an achilles tendon injury. On 17 June 2013, however, he renewed his link with the club.

On 6 October 2013, at already 29, Cobo made his professional debut, playing the last six minutes in a 3–2 home win over Real Murcia.

References

External links
 
 Futbolme profile

1984 births
Living people
Footballers from Jaén, Spain
Spanish footballers
Association football wingers
Segunda División players
Segunda División B players
Tercera División players
Elche CF Ilicitano footballers
Real Jaén footballers